Vera Olsson  is a Finnish TV-producer and TV-host. She has worked as a producer for MoonTV, FremantleMedia and The Voice TV Finland. Her works include "Venäjän halki 30 päivässä" for YLE network, "Loman Tarpeessa" and "Arman Reilaa" for Nelonen, and "Dresscode (TV series)" for MoonTV.

External links 
 
 Olsson hired as the main producer for The Voice TV Finland

Mass media people from Helsinki
Finnish television producers
1974 births
Living people